The 1994 FIVB Men's World Championship was the thirteenth edition of the tournament, organized by the world's governing body, the FIVB. It was held from 29 September to 8 October 1994 in Piraeus (Peace and Friendship Stadium) and Thessaloniki (Alexandreio Melathron Nick Galis Hall), Greece.

Qualification

Teams

Group A
 
 
 
 

Group B
 
 
 
 

Group C
 
 
 
 

Group D

Squads

Venues

Results

First round

Pool A
Venue: Peace and Friendship Stadium, Piraeus

|}

|}

Pool B
Venue: Peace and Friendship Stadium, Piraeus

|}

|}

Pool C
Venue: Alexandreio Melathron Nick Galis Hall, Thessaloniki

|}

|}

Pool D
Venue: Alexandreio Melathron Nick Galis Hall, Thessaloniki

|}

|}

Final round
Venue: Peace and Friendship Stadium, Piraeus

Play-offs for quarterfinals

|}

Group head matches

|}

Finals

Quarterfinals

|}

5th–8th semifinals

|}

Semifinals

|}

7th place match

|}

5th place match

|}

3rd place match

|}

Final

|}

Final standing

Awards

 Most Valuable Player
  Lorenzo Bernardi
 Best Spiker
  Ron Zwerver
 Best Blocker
  Jan Posthuma
 Best Server
  Marcelo Negrão

 Best Setter
  Paolo Tofoli
 Best Receiver
  Scott Fortune
 Best Digger
  Bob Ctvrtlik

References

External links
 Federation Internationale de Volleyball

World Championship
V
V
FIVB Volleyball Men's World Championship
Sports competitions in Athens
Sports competitions in Thessaloniki
FIVB Volleyball Men's World Championship
FIVB Volleyball Men's World Championship